From the New World may refer to:

Symphony No. 9 (Dvořák), From the New World, an 1893 symphony composed by Antonín Dvořák
Shadow Hearts: From the New World, a 2005 role-playing game
From the New World (novel), a 2008 novel by Yusuke Kishi
From the New World, a 2022 album by Alan Parsons

See also
Into the New World (disambiguation)